The Indian state of Madhya Pradesh came into existence on 1 November 1956. Madhya Pradesh has various geographic regions which have no official administrative governmental status; some correspond to historic countries, states or provinces. Currently, the number of districts in the state is 52. These districts are grouped into ten administrative divisions. Districts are subdivided into tehsils, of which there are 428 in Madhya Pradesh.

List of districts
There are 52 districts in Madhya Pradesh categorized into ten divisions. All districts share their name with their capital city.

Proposed districts
A bill giving in-principle approval to the creation of three districts was passed on 19 March 2020. The following districts would be created:

 Chachaura district
 Maihar district
 Nagda district

Notes

References

 
Districts
M